Count Henning Ludvig Hugo Hamilton, (16 January 1814 - 15 January 1886) was a Swedish count, politician, government official and author. His father was Gustaf Wathier Hamilton. Today he is perhaps best remembered for the so-called Hamilton scandal.

Career 
Born in Stockholm, Hamilton received his education at Uppsala University and became second lieutenant at Svea Artillery Regiment in 1829. In 1837–43 he was a teacher in the military. In 1845 he became a major in the military. He held many high-profile political positions throughout his career, such as county governor of Östergötland County (1852) and in 1859–1860 he was the minister of education and ecclesiastical affairs. He was also appointed university chancellor for Lund and Uppsala University in 1872.

He was an elected member of most learned societies in Sweden, such as the Swedish Academy and the Royal Swedish Academy of Sciences, and received honorary doctorates from Lund University (1868) and the University of Copenhagen (1879). On 28 January 1854 he was knighted into the Order of Charles XIII. He was also the permanent secretary of the Swedish Academy 1874–1881.

Hamilton scandal 
In 1881 Hamilton was caught embezzling very large sums of money from his relatives, Uppsala University, and the Swedish Academy. Hamilton was a gambler (particularly roulette and the card game Trente et Quarante) and addicted to morphine, and his gambling habits abroad, in particular in Germany, had resulted in a desperate need for money. Given the potential impact of this large scandal, particularly because high-profile socialites and King Oscar II had close friendships with Hamilton, he was spared prosecution but forced to resign from all his positions and memberships in all learned societies. He was also forced into exile, and moved to southern France. He still drew a pension from the Swedish government and he also received a pension from the Royal Order of the Seraphim. There were also rumors of King Oscar II helping him financially. He died five years later in Amélie-les-Bains, France. The movement among the ruling class of Sweden at the time to "preserve the society" decided to forget about Hamilton and today he is largely forgotten in Sweden.

Temperance movement 
Hamilton was active in the temperance movement. He was a member of Svenska nykterhetssällskapet (the Swedish Temperance Society) and served as its chairman.

Writings 

Biography 
 Palmgren, CG: Gåtan Henning Hamilton, Atlantis 2000  (in Swedish).

References 

Swedish people of Scottish descent
Swedish non-fiction writers
Members of the Royal Swedish Academy of Sciences
Members of the Swedish Academy
Uppsala University alumni
1814 births
1886 deaths
Speakers of Första kammaren
Members of the Första kammaren
Knights of the Order of Charles XIII
Swedish temperance activists
Swedish Ministers of Education and Ecclesiastical Affairs